KFIX (96.9 FM) is a radio station based in the area of Hays, Kansas, United States, with a classic rock format.  It is owned by Hull Broadcasting.

External links
KFIX official website

FIX
Classic rock radio stations in the United States
Radio stations established in 1986
1986 establishments in Kansas